is a retired Japanese voice actress from Osaka Prefecture. She was previously affiliated with With Line. On June 29, 2018, her management announced that she would retire from voice acting due to poor health.

Filmography

Anime
Akame ga Kill! (2014), Mimi, Prostitute -ep 14, Prostitute B -ep 6
Invaders of the Rokujyōma!? (2014), Yocchan
One Week Friends (2014), Girl -ep 11
Wolf Girl & Black Prince (2014), Female Student -ep 2
Absolute Duo (2015), Miyabi Hotaka
Aoharu x Machinegun (2015), Female Student
Aria the Scarlet Ammo AA (2015), Hina Fuma
Beautiful Bones: Sakurako's Investigation (2015), Yuriko Kogami
Castle Town Dandelion (2015), Child, Female Student
Classroom Crisis (2015), Female University Student
Chaos Dragon (2015), Misuka, Fukkan
Re-Kan! (2015), Female High School Student
Divine Gate (2016), Höðr
Hundred (2016), Meimei
Magic of Stella (2016), Minaha Iino
Scorching Ping Pong Girls (2016), Mune Ōmune
Three Leaves, Three Colors (2016), Teru Hayama
Princess Principal (2017), Ange
Takunomi. (2018), Michiru Amatsuki

Video games 
 Granblue Fantasy (2014), Robertina
 Raiden V: Director's Cut (2017), Eshiria Portman
 Death end re;Quest (2018), Celica Clayton

References

External links
  
 Official agency profile 
 

1993 births
Living people
Voice actresses from Osaka Prefecture
Japanese video game actresses
Japanese voice actresses